GSAT-4, also known as HealthSat, was an experimental communication and navigation satellite launched in April 2010 by the Indian Space Research Organisation on the maiden flight of the Geosynchronous Satellite Launch Vehicle Mk.II rocket. It failed to reach orbit after the rocket's third stage malfunctioned. The third stage was the first Indian-built cryogenic-fuelled upper stage, and was making its first flight. The ISRO suspects that the failure was caused by the third stage not igniting.

Satellite
Weighing around two tons, GSAT-4 carried a multi-channel, Ka-band, bent pipe and regenerative transponder, and a navigation payload in the C, L1, and L5 bands. Designed to guide civil and military aircraft, GSAT-4 was to have employed several new technologies such as a bus management unit, miniaturised dynamically tuned gyros, lithium-ion battery, 70 volt bus for Ka-band travelling-wave tube amplifiers, and electric propulsion. GSAT-4 also incorporated technological experiments like on-board structural dynamic experiment, thermal control coating experiment and vibration beam accelerometer.

GSAT-4 was also to have been the first Indian spacecraft to employ ion propulsion. Four Hall effect thrusters would have been used for north–south station keeping operations. Two types of Hall effect thrusters are developed by ISRO Satellite Centre (ISAC) and Liquid Propulsion Systems Centre (LPSC).

Secondary payloads

GSAT-4 carried the first GPS Aided Geo Augmented Navigation, or GAGAN, navigation payload. GSAT-4 was also intended to carry to the Israeli TAUVEX-2 space telescope array. Due to concerns that the new upper stage may have reduced the rocket's payload capacity, ISRO decided to remove TAUVEX in order to decrease the mass of the payload. GAGAN was still flown. GAGAN consisted of a Ka band bent pipe transponder and a regenerative transponder.

Launch
GSAT-4 was launched on the maiden flight of the GSLV Mk.II rocket, GSLV D3, flying from the Second Launch Pad at the Satish Dhawan Space Centre. Its third stage was fitted with a new Indian-built cryogenic engine, which was intended to make the GSLV reliant on only Indian technology, since earlier launches had used Russian engines. GSLV D3 was the sixth flight of the Geosynchronous Satellite Launch Vehicle across all variants.

The second stage used the same hypergolic propellants, whilst the third stage was the new Cryogenic Upper Stage (CUS), burning liquid hydrogen oxidised by liquid oxygen.

The rocket's first and second stages performed normally, and at the time controllers reported that third stage ignition had occurred. However, shortly afterwards the rocket began to under-perform, tumbling out of control, and deviating from its planned trajectory. Around 300 seconds into the flight, contact with the rocket was lost. Initial analysis of the data suggested that the vernier thrusters, used to provide attitude control, had failed to ignite due to engineering problems. On 17 April, ISRO announced that further analysis of the data indicated that the third stage main engine had not ignited either. According to ISRO, mission failed after the fuel turbo pump that supplied fuel to the cryogenic engine had stopped working a second after ignition.

References

External links

 "GSLV-D3". ISRO. Retrieved 22 October 2011.

GSAT satellites
Spacecraft launched in 2010
Satellite launch failures
2010 in India
Spacecraft launched by GSLV rockets